Malaya Sazanka is a rural locality (a selo) and the administrative center of Malasazansky Selsoviet of Svobodnensky District, Amur Oblast, Russia. The population was 1,857 as of 2018. There are 13  streets.

Geography 
Malaya Sazanka is located on the right bank of the Zeya River, 22 km south of Svobodny (the district's administrative centre) by road. Novgorodka is the nearest rural locality.

References 

Rural localities in Svobodnensky District